This is a list of compositions by Harrison Birtwistle (1934–2022), a British composer of contemporary classical music. Birtwistle's music was published by Universal Edition until 1994, and since then by Boosey & Hawkes.

Opera and other dramatised works
The Mark of the Goat, children's dramatic cantata for actors, singers, 2 choirs, 3 melody instruments, piano (6 hands), large and small percussion ensembles (1965)
Punch and Judy, A tragical comedy or comical tragedy in 1 act (1966–67)
Down by the Greenwood Side, A Dramatic Pastoral (1968–69)
Pulse Field: Frames, Pulse and Interruptions, ballet, for 6 dancers and 9 musicians (1977)
Bow Down, music theatre, for 5 actors and 4 musicians (1977)
The Mask of Orpheus, Lyric Tragedy in 3 acts (1973–83)
Yan Tan Tethera, A Mechanical Pastoral (1983-84)
Gawain, Opera in 2 acts, (1990–91, revised 1994 & 1999)
The Second Mrs Kong, Opera in 2 acts (1993–94)
The Last Supper, Opera in 1 act (1998–1999)
The Io Passion, Chamber Opera (2003)
The Minotaur, Opera (2005–07)
The Corridor, Scena for two voices and ensemble (2008–09)
The Cure, for two singers and ensemble (2014–15)

Orchestra
Chorales, for orchestra (1960–63)
Nomos, for 4 amplified instruments and orchestra (1967–68)
The Triumph of Time, for orchestra (1971–72)
Melencolia I, for clarinet, harp and 2 string orchestras (1976)
Earth Dances, for orchestra (1985–86)
Endless Parade, for trumpet, strings and vibraphone (1986–87)
Machaut à ma manière, for orchestra (1988)
Gawain's Journey, for orchestra (1991)
Antiphonies, for piano and orchestra (1992)
The Cry of Anubis, for tuba and orchestra (1994)
Panic, for alto saxophone, jazz drummer, wind, brass and percussion (1995)
Exody, for orchestra (1997)Sonance Severance 2000, for orchestra (1999)The Shadow of Night, for orchestra (2001)Night’s Black Bird, for orchestra (2004)
Concerto for Violin and Orchestra (2009–10)
 Responses, for piano and orchestra (2013-14)Deep Time, for orchestra (2016)
Variation IX in Pictured Within: Birthday Variations for M.C.B., for orchestra (2019)

Chamber ensemble without voicesThe World is Discovered, 6 Instrumental Movements after Heinrich Isaac, for chamber ensemble (1961)3 Movements with Fanfares, for chamber orchestra (1964)Tragoedia, for flute, oboe, clarinet, bassoon, horn, harp and string quartet (1965)Chorale from a Toy Shop, open scoring (1967, later versions 2016-17)Three lessons in a frame, for piano solo, flute, clarinet, violin, cello and percussion. (1967: withdrawn)Medusa, for flute, clarinet, violin, cello, piano, percussion and electronics (1969: withdrawn)Verses for Ensembles, for 3 instrumental ensembles (1968–69)Some Petals from my Twickenham Herbarium, for piccolo, clarinet in Bb, glockenspiel, piano, violin and violoncello (1969)An Imaginary Landscape, for brass, percussion and double basses (1971)Tombeau in memoriam Igor Stravinsky, for flute, clarinet, harp and string quartet (1971)Grimethorpe Aria, for brass band (1973)For O, for O, the Hobby-Horse is Forgot, Ceremony, for 6 percussionists (1976)Silbury Air, for chamber ensemble (1977)Carmen Arcadiae Mechanicae Perpetuum, for chamber ensemble or orchestra (1977–1978)Mercure: Poses Plastiques (after Erik Satie), arranged for 14 players (1980)Still Movement, for 13 solo strings (1984)Secret Theatre, for chamber ensemble (1984)Fanfare for Will, for brass ensemble (1987: unpublished)Salford Toccata, for brass band (1989)Ritual Fragment, for chamber orchestra (1990)Fanfare for Glyndebourne, for brass ensemble and timpani (1994)Bach Measures, for chamber ensemble (1996)Slow Frieze, for piano and ensemble (1996)Placid Mobile, for 36 trumpets (1998)The Silk House Tattoo, for two trumpets and side drums (1998)Sonance 2000, for brass ensemble (1999)17 Tate Riffs, for ensemble (2000)
Fanfare, for brass and percussion (2001)Tenebrae David, for brass ensemble (2001)Theseus Game, for large ensemble with two conductors (2002)Cantus Iambeus, for thirteen instruments (2004)The Io Passion: Nocturnes, for clarinet and string quartet (2004)Cortege, for 14 musicians (2007: a reworking of Ritual Fragment)Virelai (Sus une fontayne) (after Johannes Ciconia), for 12 players (2008)Crescent Moon over the Irrational, for flute doubling piccolo, clarinet, harp and string quartet (2010)Fantasia upon all the notes for flute, clarinet, harp and string quartet, (2011)In Broken Images, for woodwind, brass and percussion (2011-12)Five Lessons in a Frame, for ensemble (2015: the 5 Duets, framed by a new chorale)Sonance for a New Space, for 3 trumpets, 4 trombones and bells (2018)
 Donum Simoni MMXVIII (2018) for woodwind, brass and percussion

Instrumental groups of 5 or fewer performers, without voicesRefrains and Choruses, for wind quintet (1957)Précis, for piano (1960)Verses, for clarinet and piano (1965)Linoi, for basset clarinet in A and piano, or clarinet, piano, tape and dancer; or clarinet, piano and cello (1968)Four Interludes for a Tragedy, for basset clarinet and tape (1968)Ut Heremita Solus (after Ockeghem), for flute, clarinet, violin, cello, piano and glockenspiel (1969)Hoquetus David (after Machaut), for flute, clarinet, violin, cello, piano and glockenspiel (1969)8 Lessons for Keyboards (1969: unpublished)Signals, for clarinet and tape (1970: unpublished)Dinah and Nick's Love Song, for 3 melody instruments and harp (1970)Sad Song, for piano (1971)Chanson de Geste, for amplified sustaining instrument and tape (1973: withdrawn)
Clarinet Quintet, for clarinet and string quartet (1980)Pulse Sampler, for oboe and claves (1981)Duets for Storab, for 2 flutes (1983)Berceuse de Jeanne, for piano (1984)Antiphonies from the Moonkeeper, for trumpet (1985)Hector's Dawn, for piano (1987)An Interrupted Endless Melody, for oboe and piano (1991)5 Distances for 5 Instruments, for flute, oboe, clarinet in B flat, bassoon and horn in F (1992)Hoquetus Petrus, for two flutes and piccolo trumpet (1995)
9 Movements, for string quartet (1991–1996)Harrison’s Clocks, for piano (1997–98)The Silk House Tattoo, for two trumpets and 3 side drums (1998)Betty Freeman: Her Tango, for piano (2000)Ostinato with Melody, for piano (2000)The Axe Manual, for piano and percussion (2000)Saraband: The King's Farewell, for piano (2001)Crowd, for solo harp (2005)The Io Passion - Aubades and Nocturnes, for basset clarinet and string quartet (2006)Dance of the metro-gnome, for piano (2006)Five Little Antiphonies for Amelia, for two trumpets (2006)Double Hocket, for piano trio (2007)The Tree of Strings, for string quartet (2007)3 Fugues from The Art of Fugue (after Bach), for string quartet (2008)The Message (Duet 1), for E flat clarinet, trumpet in C and military drum (2008)Bourdon (Duet 2), for violin and viola (2009)Roddy's Reel, for bass clarinet with audience participation (2009)Oboe Quartet (2009–10)Duet 3, for cor anglais and bassoon (2010)Trio, for violin, cello and piano (2010)Gigue Machine, for piano (2011)Beyond the White Hand, for guitar (2013)Variations from the Golden Mountain, for piano (2014)Duet 4, for violin and flute (2014)Duet 5, for horn and trombone (2014)Hoquetus Irvineus, for string quartet (2014)The Silk House Sequences, for string quartet (2015)Intrada, for piano and percussion (2017)Keyboard Engine, for two pianos (2017-18)Duet for Eight Strings, for viola and cello (2018)
Vocal music (with and without instruments)Monody for Corpus Christi, for soprano, flute, violin and horn (1959)Narration: A Description of the Passing of a Year, for a cappella chorus (1963)Music for Sleep, for children's voices, piano and percussion (1963)Entr'actes and Sappho Fragments, for soprano and instruments (1964)Ring a Dumb Carillon, for soprano (+ suspended cymbals), clarinet in B flat and percussion (1964–65)Carmen Paschale, motet for choir and organ (1965)The Visions of Francesco Petrarca (1965-66: withdrawn)Monodrama (1967)Cantata, for soprano and instruments (1969)Nenia: The Death of Orpheus, for soprano, 3 bass clarinets, crotales and piano (1970)Meridian, for mezzosoprano, 2 three-part women's choirs and instruments (1970–71)Prologue, for tenor and 7 instruments (1971)The Fields of Sorrow, for 2 sopranos, 8-part choir and instruments (1972)Epilogue, "Full fathom five", for baritone, horn, 4 trombones and 6 tam-tams (1972)La Plage: 8 Arias of Remembrance, for soprano and 5 instruments (1972)Five Chorale Preludes (after J.S. Bach), for soprano, clarinet, basset horn and bass clarinet (1975)… agm …, for 16 voices and 3 instrumental ensembles (1978–1979)On the Sheer Threshold of the Night, Madrigal, for 4 soloists and 12-voice choir (1980)Deowa, for soprano and clarinet in B flat (1983)Songs by Myself, for soprano and chamber ensemble (1984)Words Overheard, for soprano and chamber orchestra (1985)4 Songs of Autumn, for soprano and string quartet (1988)An die Musik, for soprano and chamber ensemble (1988)The Wine Merchant Robin of Mere, for male voice and piano (1989)4 Poems by Jaan Kaplinski, for soprano and 13 instruments (1991)9 Settings of Celan (may be performed as a set or individually) for soprano, 2 clarinets, viola, cello and double bass (1989–96)Pulse Shadows (the 9 Movements for string quartet interleaved with the 9 Settings of Celan) (1989–96)The Woman and the Hare, for soprano, reciter and ensemble (1998)Love Cries, from the opera The Second Mrs. Kong, for soprano, mezzo-soprano, tenor and orchestra (1999)Three Latin Motets, from The Last Supper, for unaccompanied choir (1999)9 Settings of Lorine Niedecker, for soprano and cello (1998–2000)The Sadness of Komachi, for tenor and prepared piano (2000)The Ring Dance of the Nazarene, for baritone, tombak, choir and ensemble (2003)The Gleam, for unaccompanied choir (2003)3 Brendel Settings, for baritone and orchestra (2000–04)3 Arias by Bach, for soprano, countertenor and chamber ensemble (2003–04)26 Orpheus Elegies, for oboe, harp and countertenor (2003–04)Today Too, for tenor, flute and guitar (2004)Neruda Madrigales, for chorus and ensemble with live electronics (2004–05)The Mouse Felt…, for baritone and piano (2005)Lullaby, for two sopranos, unaccompanied (2006)Song of Myself, for baritone, double bass and percussion (2006)Bogenstrich for baritone, cello and piano (2006-09)Angel Fighter, for chamber chorus, tenor, countertenor and ensemble (2009)From Vanitas, for tenor and piano (2009)Semper Dowland, semper dolens (after Dowland), for tenor and ensemble (2009)3 Settings of Lorine Niedecker, for soprano and cello (2011)The Moth Requiem, for twelve female voices, three harps and alto flute (2012)Songs from the Same Earth, for tenor and piano (2012-13)Chorale-Prelude, for SATB chorus a capella (2014)Three Songs from The Holy Forest, for soprano and ensemble (2016-17)...when falling asleep, for soprano, speaker and ensemble (2019)
Electronic musicChronometer, for 2 asynchronous 4-track tapes (1971–72)
Incidental music for theatre
National Theatre productions
Hamlet (1975)
Tamburlaine the Great (1976)
Julius Caesar (1977)
Volpone (1977)
The Country Wife (1977)
The Cherry Orchard (1978: with Dominic Muldowney)
Brand (1978)
The Double Dealer (1978)Herod (1978: with Dominic Muldowney)
As You Like It (1979)
The Oresteia (1981)
The Trojan War Will Not Take Place (1983)
Coriolanus (1984)
The Tempest (1988)
The Winter's Tale (1988)
Cymbeline (1988)
Bacchai (2002)
OtherThe Innocents (play by William Archibald) (1976)
Film scores
 The Offence (1972)
References
 Sir Harrison Birtwistle biography and works on the UE website (publisher of his music until 1994)
Harrison Birtwistle biography and works on the Boosey & Hawkes website (publisher of his music since 1994)
 Cross, J.: Harrison Birtwistle: Man, Mind, Music.'' (Faber & Faber, 2000.) Has a comprehensive work list up to 1998

Lists of compositions by composer